Warlick is a surname. Notable people with the surname include:

Bob Warlick (1941–2005), American basketball player
David Warlick (born 1952), American educator, author, programmer and public speaker
Ernie Warlick (1932–2012), American football player
Hermene Warlick Eichhorn (1906–2001), American musician and composer
Holly Warlick (born 1958), American women's basketball coach and former player
James B. Warlick Jr. (born 1956), American diplomat
Mary Burce Warlick (born 1957), American diplomat
Tom Warlick (1888–1939), American football player and coach
Wilson Warlick (1892–1978), American judge